is a baseball game for the Nintendo 64. It was released only in Japan in 1997.

References

1997 video games
Baseball video games
Hudson Soft games
Japan-exclusive video games
Nintendo 64 games
Nintendo 64-only games
Video games developed in Japan